Joan Weber (December 12, 1935 – May 13, 1981) was an American popular music singer.

Early years 
Weber was raised in Paulsboro, New Jersey, and married to George Verfaillie, a young bandleader. She was pregnant in 1954 when she was introduced to Eddie Joy, a manager, who in turn introduced her to Charles Randolph Grean, an A&R worker for RCA  and Dot Records in New York.

Career 
Grean gave a demo of Weber singing "Marionette" to Mitch Miller, the head of artists and repertoire at Columbia Records. Miller took "Let Me Go, Devil" and had it rewritten by Jenny Lou Carson and Al Hill as "Let Me Go, Lover!" for Weber, who recorded it on the Columbia label (with "Marionette" as the B-side). The song was performed on the television show, Studio One and caught the public's fancy, reaching #1 in the United States and #16 in the United Kingdom in 1955. It sold over one million copies, and was awarded a gold disc.  "Let Me Go, Lover!" ascended to #1 on the Billboard Most Played by Jockeys chart on January 1, 1955, the date that the rock and roll era began, according to music historians such as Joel Whitburn. A few weeks after the Studio One broadcast, Weber began performing at the Copacabana in New York City without being prepared for such a venue. "I was caught without an act," she said.

At the time of the song's biggest success, however, Weber gave birth to a daughter, Terry Lynn, and was unable to promote her career. Weber's next single, "Lover Lover (Why Must We Part)" (b/w "Tell the Lord", Columbia 40474), released later in 1954, failed to dent the record charts. (Mitch Miller, in a 2004 interview for the Archive of American Television, recalled that Weber's husband assumed total control of the singer's activities, thus depriving Weber of experienced career guidance.) After three more non-hits, "Call Me Careless", "Goodbye Lollipops, Hello Lipstick" and the appropriately-titled "Gone", Weber was dropped from Columbia's roster.

In 1957, Weber resumed singing in nightclubs. With sleek dresses, blonde hair, and a focus on ballads, she performed in Dallas, Houston, New Orleans, Ottawa, and Washington.

Later years 
During her final years, she lived a reclusive life before moving to a mental institution. Columbia Records' efforts to send her royalty checks failed, as they were returned to sender as "address unknown". For this reason, chart program American Top 40 ranked Weber at number one on a special program featuring the "Top 40 Disappearing Acts", which was broadcast in 1975.

Death
On May 13, 1981, Weber died of heart failure at a mental institution in Ancora, Winslow Township, Camden County, New Jersey, aged 45. Her death was overshadowed by the first attempted assassination of Pope John Paul II on the same date.

Hit record
 "Let Me Go, Lover!" (1955)

References

External links
 [ Biography] at AllMusic

1935 births
1981 deaths
People from Paulsboro, New Jersey
People from Winslow Township, New Jersey
Traditional pop music singers
20th-century American singers
20th-century American women singers